Juventus Football Club (from , 'youth'), known for commercial purposes as Juventus Women or simply Juve Women, is a women's football club based in Turin, Piedmont, Italy. It was established in 2017 as the women's section of the homonymous club, following an acquisition of the sporting license of Cuneo.

The team compete in Serie A, the top flight in national football, since its debut in the 2017–18 season. They have won five league titles, two Coppa Italia titles, and three Supercoppa Italiana titles, becoming one of the country's most successful teams. In 2020–21 they became the first Italian club (women's or men's) to accomplish a perfect season, having won all their league matches. After their 2021–22 league triumph, Juventus became the first team to win five consecutive league titles.

History

Formation (2017) 
Juventus' general manager Giuseppe Marotta announced in May 2017 that the club was planning to form a women's team. The women's section of Juventus was officially formed on 1 July 2017.

Colloquially known as Juventus Women, the team was formed thanks to the possibility given by the Italian Football Federation (FIGC) to professional men's clubs to purchase amateur women's clubs. Already active in women's youth football since 2015, Juventus acquired the sporting licence of Serie A club Cuneo, which in the meantime had dissolved, allowing the newly-formed team to directly compete in the Italian top division; several players were signed from neighbouring Brescia, Italian champions in two of the previous four seasons and runners-up in the others.

Rita Guarino era (2017–2021) 
Under the tenure of Rita Guarino, Juventus quickly emerged as a dominating force in Italy, winning four consecutive league titles in their first four years of activity. In the 2017–18 Serie A, the club was tied with Brescia for first place at 60 points. The two sides played a single-legged play-off match where, following a goalless draw after 120 minutes, Juventus beat Brescia 5–4 in a penalty shoot-out.

In 2018–19, by virtue of having won the previous season's league title, they qualified for the UEFA Champions League; they lost 3–2 on aggregate to Brøndby in the round of 32. , Juventus achieved the domestic double, winning their second Serie A title and first Coppa Italia. In 2019–20, Juventus won both the Supercoppa Italiana, their first title, and their third consecutive league title. In only two years, the team won all the trophies of Italian women's football.

In the 2020–21 season, Juventus won their second Supercoppa Italiana, and their fourth-consecutive league title, becoming only the second club to achieve this streak after Torres in 2013. They finished the season winning all 22 league matches, becoming the first team in the Italian women's top flight to accomplish a perfect season.

Joe Montemurro era (2021–present) 
After four seasons at the club, Guarino left Juventus, and was replaced by Joe Montemurro ahead of the 2021–22 season. Juventus won their fifth-consecutive league title, establishing a record streak in Italian women's football. They also finished among the best eight teams in Europe, reaching the quarterfinals of the 2021–22 Champions League. Having also won the Coppa Italia and Supercoppa Italiana that season, their second and third respectively, Juventus achieved their first domestic treble.

Season by season

Players

Current squad

Managerial history
Below is a list of Juventus Women coaches from 2017 until the present day.

Honours
Serie A
Winners (5): 2017–18, 2018–19, 2019–20, 2020–21, 2021–22
Coppa Italia
Winners (2): , 
Supercoppa Italiana
Winners (3): 2019, 2020–21, 2021–22
Runners-up (1): 2018

European record

Overall record

By country

By club

Partnerships 
In March 2023, Bitget was announced as the official sponsor for the club.

Notes

See also 
 List of women's association football clubs
 List of women's football clubs in Italy
 List of unbeaten football club seasons

References

External links 

  

 
2017 establishments in Italy
Association football clubs established in 2017
Football clubs in Turin
Women's football clubs in Italy
Serie A (women's football) clubs